Anisha Vekemans (born 17 August 1991) is a Belgian former professional racing cyclist, who rode professionally between 2010 and 2019 for the , ,  and  teams. She competed in the women's road race at the 2015 UCI Road World Championships.

Major results

2010
 10th Chrono des Nations
2012
 10th Overall Trophée d'Or Féminin
2015
 3rd Time trial, Antwerp Provincial Road Championships
 9th Overall Trophée d'Or Féminin
1st Stage 4
2016
 7th Overall Gracia–Orlová

See also
 List of 2015 UCI Women's Teams and riders

References

External links

1991 births
Living people
Belgian female cyclists
People from Lommel
Cyclists at the 2016 Summer Olympics
Olympic cyclists of Belgium
Cyclists from Limburg (Belgium)
21st-century Belgian women